Simon J Rogers is a software developer and publisher who has worked primarily on cartography software and role-playing games.

Career
Simon Rogers and Mark Fulford formed ProFantasy Software in 1993 to create a professional map-making program for RPGs, the result being Campaign Cartographer (1993). Pelgrane Press was formed in 1999, and was initially owned by Rogers, ProFantasy Software, and Sasha Bilton. Rogers acquired the license to Jack Vance's world of the Dying Earth for use by this brand-new roleplaying company, which published The Dying Earth Roleplaying Game in 2001.

References

External links
 Simon Rogers :: Pen & Paper RPG Database archive

British publishers (people)
Living people
Year of birth missing (living people)